John Mackenzie was a Scottish footballer who played as a left back in the Scottish League for Cowdenbeath and Rangers.

Personal life 
McKenzie worked as a butcher and later served in the Black Watch during the First World War.

Career statistics

Honours 
Cowdenbeath
 Scottish League Second Division: 1913–14, 1914–15

Individual
Cowdenbeath Hall of Fame

References 

Scottish footballers
Cowdenbeath F.C. players
Scottish Football League players
Association football fullbacks
Elgin City F.C. players
Forres Mechanics F.C. players
1882 births
People from Badenoch and Strathspey
Place of death missing
Year of death missing
British Army personnel of World War I
Black Watch soldiers
Scottish butchers
Clackmannan F.C. players